National Highway 205 commonly referred to as NH 205, is a highway in India. The highway passes through the Indian states of Himachal Pradesh and Punjab.

Route
The highway starts at Kharar near Chandigarh. It passes through Ropar and Kiratpur Sahib in Punjab and Swarghat, Namhol, Darlaghat in Himachal Pradesh and terminates near Shimla.

Old NH numbers of new NH 205
After renumbering of all national highways by National Highway Authority of India in 2010, parts of the former NH 21 and NH 88 have been combined with parts of former NH 5 to create the new NH 205.

 Kharar - Swarghat (in Bilaspur district) section of old NH 21. 
 Swarghat - Darlaghat (near Solan) section of old NH 88.
 Darlaghat via Nauni (near Solan) - near Shimla section of old NH 5.

See also
Leh-Manali Highway
 List of National Highways in India by highway number
 National Highways Development Project

References

External links 
NH 205 on OpenStreetMap
 

National highways in India
National Highways in Himachal Pradesh
National Highways in Punjab, India
Transport in Shimla